Harald Kristian Dannevig (1871 – December 1914) was a Norwegian-born fisheries expert.  In 1902 he was appointed by the government of New South Wales, Australia as superintendent of fisheries investigations and fish hatcheries. In 1908 he became Commonwealth Director of Fisheries and identified large trawlable fishing grounds around south-eastern Australia.

Disappearance and aftermath
He was lost at sea on the fisheries investigation ship (F.I.S.) Endeavour, which left Macquarie Island on 3 December 1914 and was never seen again. The ship was presumed by a marine court of inquiry to have foundered on 5 December 1914.

Dannevig Island off Wilsons Promontory is named after him.

See also
List of people who disappeared mysteriously at sea

References

1871 births
1910s missing person cases
1914 deaths
20th-century Australian public servants
People lost at sea